This is a list of Billboard magazine's Top Hot 100 songs of 1975. The Top 100, as revealed in the year-end edition of Billboard dated December 27, 1975, is based on Hot 100 charts from the issue dates of November 2, 1974 through November 1, 1975.

See also
1975 in music
List of Billboard Hot 100 number-one singles of 1975
List of Billboard Hot 100 top-ten singles in 1975

References

1975 record charts
Billboard charts